is a town located in Shiribeshi Subprefecture, Hokkaido, Japan.

As of September 2016, the town has an estimated population of 6,136, and a density of 20 persons per km2. The total area is 304.96 km2.

Geography
Kyōwa is located just south of the Shakotan Peninsula, near the Niseko Volcanic Group.

Neighboring towns and village
 Iwanai
 Niki
 Kutchan
 Rankoshi
 Furubira
 Tomari

Climate

History
1880: The village of Hattari was founded.
1897: The village of Maeda was founded.
1901: The village of Kozawa was founded.
1906: Hattari Village and Maeda Village became Second Class Villages.
1909: Kozawa Village became a Second Class Village.
1923: Hattari Village and Maeda Village became First Class Villages.
1955: Hattari Village, Maeda Village, and Kozawa Village were merged to form the new village of Kyōwa.
1971: Kyōwa Village became Kyōwa Town.

Economics
Kyōwa's main economic activity is farming, with watermelon, Japanese melon, and sweet corn as major crops. In line with the agricultural theme, the town's mascot is the kakashi, or scarecrow, images of which adorn features of the town including brickwork and light posts.

Education
 High school
 Hokkaido Kyōwa High School
 Junior high school
 Kyōwa Junior High School
 Elementary school
 Toyo Elementary School
 Seiryo Elementary School
 Hokushin Elementary School

Transportation
Iwanai Line (Japanese National Railways) used to run through the town from Kozawa Station to Iwanai Station (Iwanai).
 Hakodate Main Line: Kozawa Station
 Route 5

References

External links

Official Website 

Towns in Hokkaido